The Indigenous-Aboriginal Party of Australia is a minor Australian political party, launched and based in Wilcannia, New South Wales. The party's main objective is to tackle Indigenous issues and for Indigenous rights and to stop development projects destroying native land. It was formed in 2020, and gained federal registration on 29 November 2021. , it is stated to have over 2,000 members.
 
The party was formed in October 2020 by Owen Whyman, who is of Paakantyi and Malyangapa origin, and is open to Indigenous and non-Indigenous people. However, all party board members and candidates must be Indigenous.

, the party has six candidates for the 2022 federal election, with Whyman running in the Senate for New South Wales.

References

 

2020 establishments in Australia
Political parties established in 2020
Indigenous Australian politics
Political parties in Australia
Indigenist political parties in Oceania